Erebia nivalis, or de Lesse's brassy ringlet, is a member of the subfamily Satyrinae of the family Nymphalidae. It is found throughout the Alps of southern Austria with a remote population in central Switzerland.

The wingspan is 34–36 mm. Adults are on wing from mid-July to the beginning of August. Development takes two years.

The larvae feed on various grasses, but mainly Festuca species.

References

External links 
 Eurobutterflies

Erebia
Butterflies of Europe
Butterflies described in 1954